Guilherme Adolfo Almeida Farinha (born 11 February 1956) is a Portuguese manager who most recently was in charge of Costa Rican side Carmelita.

In May 2013, Farinha was announced as the new manager of Costa Rican side Liga Deportiva Alajuelense.

References

External links
Guilherme Farinha at Footballdatabase

1956 births
Living people
Sportspeople from Lisbon
Portuguese football managers
Guinea-Bissau national football team managers
L.D. Alajuelense managers
C.S. Herediano managers
C.S.D. Municipal managers
Portuguese expatriates in Guinea-Bissau
Expatriate football managers in Guinea-Bissau
Expatriate football managers in Paraguay
Expatriate football managers in Costa Rica
Expatriate football managers in Iran
Expatriate football managers in Guatemala
Portuguese expatriates in Iran
S.C. Praiense managers
F.C. Oliveira do Hospital managers
Sportivo Luqueño managers
Casa Pia A.C. managers